Haiducii is a 1966 Romanian film directed by Dinu Cocea.

Cast
 Ion Besoiu - căpetenia de haiduci Amza  
 Marga Barbu - hangița Anița  
 Amza Pellea - haiducul Sârbu  
 Elisabeta Jar - Maria, fiica vel-vistiernicului Dudescu  
 Toma Caragiu - haiducul Răspopitul  
 Fory Etterle - domnitorul (creditat Fory Eterle) 
 Ion Finteșteanu - Ahmed Pașa, trimisul sultanului
 Alexandru Giugaru - boierul Belivacă
 Florin Scărlătescu - vel-vistiernicul Dudescu  
 Marin Moraru - haiducul Dascălu 
 Mircea Sîntimbreanu - haiducul Zdrelea  
 Constantin Guriță - Duduveică  
 Ileana Buhoci-Gurgulescu - țiganca Fira (as Elena Buhoci)
 Jean Constantin - țiganul Parpanghel
 Colea Răutu - arnăut

External links
 

1966 films
Romanian action films
Films directed by Dinu Cocea